Cross-country skiing at the 1976 Winter Paralympics consisted of 25 events, 15 for men and 10 for women.

Medal table

Medal summary 
The competition events were:

5 km: men - women
10 km: men - women
15 km: men
3x5 km relay: men - women
3x10 km relay: men

Each event had separate standing, or visually impaired classifications:

I - standing, single-leg amputation above the knee
II - standing, single-leg amputation below the knee
III - standing, single-arm amputation
IV B - standing, double-arm amputation
A - visually impaired, no functional vision
B - visually impaired, under 10% functional vision

Men's events

Women's events

See also
Cross-country skiing at the 1976 Winter Olympics

References 

 
The information from the International Paralympic Committee (IPC) website is based on sources which do not present all information from earlier paralympic games (19601984), such as relay and team members. (Per Nov.20, 2010)
 
 Historical Medallists : Vancouver 2010 Winter Paralympics, Official website of the 2010 Winter Paralympics
 Winter Sport Classification, Canadian Paralympic Committee

1976 Winter Paralympics events
1976
Paralympics